Thomas Dyke Acland Tellefsen (November 26, 1823–October 6, 1874) was a Norwegian pianist and composer. As a composer Tellefsen wrote 44 opuses: solo piano works, two piano concertos, and chamber music. He dedicated many of his compositions to the Polish, Russian, and French aristocracy.

Life
Thomas Tellefsen, the youngest of six siblings, was born in Trondheim, Norway, where he studied with his father, the organist Johan Christian Tellefsen (1774–1857), and with Ole Andreas Lindeman. Thomas gave his first public concert in his home town in the spring of 1842. Shortly after, he went to Paris, where he became the pupil of his compatriot Charlotte Thygeson, and later attended some of Friedrich Kalkbrenner's classes. During the years 1844 to 1847, he was taught periodically by Frédéric Chopin, who also became his personal friend and had considerable influence on his musical taste, style of playing, and compositions.

Duchess Marcelina Czartoryska took him to the Hôtel Lambert in Paris, where he made his debut as a pianist with great success on 29 April 1851. Soon after that, Tellefsen became regarded as one of the outstanding pianists of his time, and was especially admired as an interpreter of Chopin's music. When Chopin died in 1849, Tellefsen took over some of his teacher's pupils, including Jane Stirling. In the 1850s and 1860s, Tellefsen was regarded as a very successful pianist, and he toured several times in England, Sweden, and Norway. He died in Paris, and is buried at the Cimetière d´Auteuil.

Compositions
Among his published works, Tellefsen wrote sixteen mazurkas, five chamber music works (two sonatas for violin and piano, a sonata for cello and piano, a sonata for two pianos, and a trio for piano, violin and cello), composed between 1854 and 1867. He also wrote two piano concertos, the first in 1848 and the second in 1853, six waltzes, four nocturnes, three études, and a number of larger works and salon pieces, which were written for the teaching of his pupils.

Works with opus number

Works without opus number
Tellefsen's works without opus number are either piano studies or liturgical pieces. His Moderato, written in 1842, is one of his first attempts in composition. Another collection of works consists of twenty-one short fughettas, versetti and cantabile pieces, suitable in length in Roman Catholic and Lutheran services during the time they were written. The versetti are organ verses played in alternation with sung verses of hymns. The preludes were played for organ or piano with pedal. They were used as preludes and postludes, while a cantabile piece might also appear after the sermon as an introduction to the next hymn. Variations on hymn tunes are a much-used form in church services as well. 

{| class="wikitable sortable" style="width:100%; text-align: center"
|-
! width= 277                     |Title
! width= 116  class="unsortable" |Number
! width= 118                     |Key
! width= 173                     |Tempo markings
! width=  79                     |Genre
! width=  36                     |Year 
! width=  20  class="unsortable" |Notes
|-
| Valse
| style="background-color:#E5E4E2;" | —
| A major
| —
| Piano solo
| —
| —
|-
| Moderato
| style="background-color:#E5E4E2;" | —
| —
| —
| Piano solo
| 1842
| —
|-
| Choral variations on the hymn "Kimer, I klokker"
| style="background-color:#E5E4E2;" | —
| G major
| —
| Piano solo
| —
|  
|-
| Prelude
| style="background-color:#E5E4E2;" | —
| G major
| Allegro moderato
| Piano solo
| —
| —
|-
| Lento - Allegro moderato - Tempo primo
| style="background-color:#E5E4E2;" | —
| —
| —
| Piano solo
| —
| —
|- 
| Larghetto
| style="background-color:#E5E4E2;" | —
| —
| —
| Piano solo
| —
| —
|- 
| Prelude
| style="background-color:#E5E4E2;" | —
| G major
| —
| Piano solo
| —
| —
|- 
| Suite: Prelude, Versette, Prelude 2, Prelude da capo
| style="background-color:#E5E4E2;" | —
| G minor
| —
| Piano solo
| —
| —
|-
| rowspan="21" | Fughetta'r, Versettes & Cantabilla
| Fughetta I
| C major
| —
| rowspan="21" | Piano solo
| rowspan="21" | —
| rowspan="21" | 
|-
| Fughetta II
| C major
| —
|-
| Fughetta III
| C major
| —
|-
| Fughetta IV
| A minor
| —
|-
| Fughetta V
| A minor
| —
|-
| Fughetta VI
| A minor
| —
|-
| Fugheta VII
| A minor
| —
|-
| Versette
| G minor
| —
|-
| Fughetta VIII
| G minor
| —
|-
| Cantabille
| G minor
| —
|-
| Fughetta IX
| G major
| —
|-
| Fughetta X
| G major
| —
|-
| Fughetta XI
| G major
| —
|-
| Cantabille
| C major
| —
|-
| Cantabille
| D major
| —
|-
| Fughetta XII
| D dorian
| —
|-
| Interlude 
| D dorian
| —
|-
| Fughetta XIII
| D dorian
| —
|-
| Versette
| D minor
| —
|-
| Fughetta XIV
| D minor
| —
|-
| Fughetta XV
| E minor
| —
|-
| Prelude to Fugue
| style="background-color:#E5E4E2;" | —
| —
| —
| Piano solo
| —
| —
|- 
| A Minor Variation
| style="background-color:#E5E4E2;" | —
| —
| —
| Piano solo
| —
| —
|- 
| Waltz
| style="background-color:#E5E4E2;" | —
| A minor
| —
| Piano solo
| —
| —
|- 
| Adagio
| style="background-color:#E5E4E2;" | —
| D major
| —
| Piano solo
| —
| —
|- 
| Prelude
| style="background-color:#E5E4E2;" | —
| G minor
| —
| Piano solo
| —
| —
|- 
| Preludio Andantino - mixolidian d - da capo al fine
| style="background-color:#E5E4E2;" | —
| E minor
| — 
| Piano solo
| —
| — 
|-
| Preludio I
| style="background-color:#E5E4E2;" | —
| G major
| —
| Piano solo 
| —
| —
|-
| Prelude
| style="background-color:#E5E4E2;" | —
| D major
| — 
| Piano solo
| —
| —
|-
| Prelude (Picardian)
| style="background-color:#E5E4E2;" | —
| E
| — 
| Piano solo
| —
| 
|-
| Fuga
| style="background-color:#E5E4E2;" | —
| D 
| —
| Piano solo 
| —
| 
|-
| Prelude II
| style="background-color:#E5E4E2;" | —
| G major
| —
| Piano solo 
| —
| — 
|-
| Adagio
| style="background-color:#E5E4E2;" | —
| D minor
| Alla breve
| Piano solo 
| —
| — 
|-
| Prelude III'
| style="background-color:#E5E4E2;" | —
| G major
| —
| Piano solo
| —
| — 
|-
| Interlude| style="background-color:#E5E4E2;" | —
| C major
| —
| Piano solo
| —
| — 
|-
| Variations on the Hymn "Jesus styr du mine tanker"| style="background-color:#E5E4E2;" | —
| G major
| —
| Piano solo
| —
|   
|-
| Prelude on the Hymn "I Jesu Navn"| style="background-color:#E5E4E2;" | —
| G minor
| —
| Piano solo
| —
|  
|}

Additional information

Notes

References

Bibliography
Dalaker, Ingrid Loe (2005): Thomas Tellefsen i norsk og fransk musikkultur (eng. Thomas Tellefsen in Norwegian and French music culture). Doctor of Musical Arts at the Norwegian University of Science and Technology.
Huldt-Nystrøm, Hampus (1959): Thomas Dyke Acland Tellefsen.
(pl) Olszewski, Edward (2013): Fryderyk Chopin i Thomas Dyke Acland Tellefsen. Polsko - norweskie więzi muzyczne odkrywa pianistka Małgorzata Jaworska z Krakowa i norweskiego Arendal'', Wydawnictwo Adam Marszałek, Toruń 2013, .

External links

1823 births
1874 deaths
Burials at Père Lachaise Cemetery
Norwegian classical composers
Norwegian classical pianists
Musicians from Trondheim
Pupils of Frédéric Chopin
Polish Romantic composers
19th-century classical composers
19th-century classical pianists
19th-century Norwegian composers